Daniel Owino Misiani (22 February 1940 – 17 May 2006) was a Tanzanian-born musician based in Kenya, where he led the Shirati Jazz collective. He was known as the "King of History" in Kenya; overseas and in Tanzania, he was known as "the grandfather of benga", which he pioneered.

Early life and career
Misiani was born in Nyamagongo, a quiet village just north of Shirati in Mara Region, Tanzania, close to the eastern shore of Lake Victoria and the border with Kenya. His parents were singers, but opposed his choice of a musical career on religious grounds. Nevertheless, he moved to Kenya in the 1960s to be a musician. He first recorded with the Victoria Boys in 1965. The band changed its name many times before becoming popular as Shirati Jazz band. He sang mostly in Dholuo and Swahili languages. He is known as a pioneering contributor to the Benga music genre. During his long career he released numerous recordings, with some international releases. He was imprisoned on several occasions for lyrics that were perceived as crossing the line into political criticism.

One of his sons, Robert Misiani, pursued a career as a hip hop musician under the stage name Gun B. Robert was best known for "Nampenda" hit, a collaboration with Pilipili. Robert died on October 20, 2007, due to illness.

Death and legacy
Misiani died on 17 May 2006 in a road traffic accident at an accident hotspot in Kisumu, on the highway to Kakamega, in a crash between a minibus and a public transport van in which many others were injured. At time of his death, aged 66, he was still an active performer. Misiani, who was polygamous, had two wives (Felista and Beatrice) with 14 children.

After the death of Daniel Owino Misiani, the leadership of his band Shirati Jazz was taken over by his wife and long-time band member Queen Babito (Beatrice Atieno Owino).

Discography

As a contributing artist
 The Rough Guide to the Music of Kenya and Tanzania (1996, World Music Network)

See also 
 Luo people of Kenya and Tanzania
 Mara Region

References

External links 
 Discography of D.O. MISIANI & SHIRATI JAZZ
 Misiani was born to sing benga, Daily Nation, May 19, 2006:
 , The Standard, May 18, 2006

1940 births
2006 deaths
Luo people
Road incident deaths in Kenya
Tanzanian musicians
People from Mara Region
Tanzanian emigrants to Kenya